Halban, Hama  is a Syrian village located in Salamiyah Subdistrict in Salamiyah District, Hama. According to the Syria Central Bureau of Statistics (CBS), Halban, Hama had a population of 653 in the 2004 census.

References 

Populated places in Salamiyah District